Policarp Malîhin (born 9 March 1954) is a retired Romanian sprint canoeist who mostly competed in doubles together with Larion Serghei. They won a bronze medal at the 1976 Olympics and two medals at the 1975 World Championships.

References

External links

1954 births
Canoeists at the 1976 Summer Olympics
Living people
Romanian male canoeists
Olympic canoeists of Romania
Olympic bronze medalists for Romania
Olympic medalists in canoeing
ICF Canoe Sprint World Championships medalists in kayak
Medalists at the 1976 Summer Olympics